Carl von Thieme (born 30 April 1844, Erfurt – died 10 October 1924, Munich) was a German banker.

His father was the director of German insurance company Thuringia. In 1880, he founded together with Wilhelm von Finck and Theodor von Cramer-Klett the German insurance company Munich Re, and in 1890 in Berlin was, with von Finck, co-founder of Allianz AG, a financial services company. Thieme was general director of Munich Re until 1922.

Awards 
 1914: Merit Order of the Bavarian Crown

References

External links 
 MunichRe: Carl von Thieme

19th-century German businesspeople
Businesspeople in insurance
German company founders
German bankers
Businesspeople from Erfurt
1844 births
1924 deaths